Amblyraja is a genus of skates that primarily are found in the Atlantic, but species also occur in the East and North Pacific, the Arabian Sea, the sub-Antarctic, and off Southern Australia and New Zealand.

Species
Ten recognized species are placed in this genus:
 Amblyraja badia (Garman, 1899) (broad skate)
 Amblyraja doellojuradoi (Pozzi, 1935) (southern thorny skate)
 Amblyraja frerichsi (G. Krefft, 1968) (thickbody skate)
 Amblyraja georgiana (Norman, 1938) (Antarctic starry skate)
 Amblyraja hyperborea (Collett, 1879) (Arctic skate)
 Amblyraja jenseni (Bigelow & Schroeder, 1950) (shorttail skate)
 Amblyraja radiata (Donovan, 1808) (thorny skate)
 Amblyraja reversa (Lloyd, 1906) (reversed skate)
 Amblyraja robertsi (Hulley, 1970) (bigmouth skate)
 Amblyraja taaf (E. E. Meisner, 1987) (whiteleg skate)

References 

 
Rajidae
Ray genera
Taxa named by August Wilhelm Malm
Taxonomy articles created by Polbot